Greatest Hits is a greatest hits album released by David Essex on 6 March 2006.
The album contains 20 of his biggest hits to date.

Track listing

All songs written by David Essex, except where specified.

 "Rock On"
 "Gonna Make You a Star"
 "Lamplight"
 "Hold Me Close"
 "Stardust"
 "America"
 "Rolling Stone"
 "If I Could"
 "City Lights"
 "Oh What a Circus" (Andrew Lloyd Webber, Tim Rice)
 "Silver Dream Machine"
 "Heart on My Sleeve" (Stephen Ernest Colyer, David Essex)
 "Me and My Girl (Night-Clubbing)"
 "Falling Angels Riding"
 "Missing You (Magic)" (Carlotta Christy)
 "Picture This Sky"
 "It's Gonna Be Alright"
 "You're in My Heart"
 "Tahiti" (Richard Crane, David Essex)
 "A Winter's Tale" (Mike Batt, Tim Rice)

Charts

Weekly charts

Year-end charts

References

David Essex albums
2006 greatest hits albums